The 1965 Oregon Webfoots football team represented University of Oregon in the Athletic Association of Western Universities (AAWU) during the 1965 NCAA University Division football season. The Webfoots were led by fifteenth-year head coach Len Casanova and finished with a record of four wins, five losses, and one tie (4–5–1 overall, 0–5 in AAWU, last).

Three home games were played on campus at Hayward Field in Eugene and three at Multnomah Stadium in Portland.

Schedule

References

External links
 Game program: Oregon at Washington State – November 6, 1965
 WSU Libraries: Game video – Oregon at Washington State – November 6, 1965

Oregon
Oregon Ducks football seasons
Oregon Webfoots football